The Stourbridge Line  is a shortline railroad that operates  of former Erie Lackawanna Railroad trackage between Honesdale and Lackawaxen, Pennsylvania where it connects with Norfolk Southern Railway. The line was previously owned by the Lackawaxen-Honesdale Shippers Association and operated under contract by Robey Railroads. The operation was contracted to the Morristown & Erie Railway in January, 2009; service ended in 2011. Service was resumed by the Delaware, Lackawaxen & Stourbridge Railroad (DL&S) on May 9, 2015.

Early history
The railroad traces its beginnings to the Delaware & Hudson Canal transporting barges of coal up from Pennsylvania and destined for the Hudson River and eventually the ports of New York City. A gravity railroad was built to carry coal over the mountains from Carbondale to Honesdale in 1829. Coal would be transferred from train to canal boat at Honesdale. 

Seeking to haul greater amounts, the idea of steam-powered locomotion was proposed. The leaders in steam technology at the time were in Great Britain, so three engines were ordered and delivered to America. According to the Wayne County Chamber of Commerce, this is the site of "the first commercial locomotive on rails in the western hemisphere" took place on August 8, 1829. The locomotive was the Stourbridge Lion. A replica of the Stourbridge Lion steam engine is on display in Honesdale to this day. Both the gravity railroad and the canal were shut down by 1898, and the D&H left to pursue other transportation activities.

Erie Railroad era
In 1860, the Pennsylvania Coal Company began the construction of a 16-mile-long railroad from Hawley, Pennsylvania, to a connection with the Erie Railroad at Lackawaxen. This new line was quickly leased to the Erie Railroad, and it was operated as its Hawley Branch. In 1868, the charter of the Jefferson Railroad was reactivated and construction progressed from Hawley towards Honesdale, hoping to reach Carbondale. This extension would never be built, even after the Erie took over in 1870. It would continue operation as the Honesdale Branch, and coal was the primary traffic.

Coal traffic declined through the 1930s, but new local business took its place, warranting a five-day-a-week operation. In 1960, the Erie merged with the Delaware, Lackawanna and Western Railroad to form the Erie Lackawanna Railroad (EL). Traffic on the branch remained steady at about 3,000 cars per year.
 
Hurricane Agnes hit the East on June 22, 1972. After estimating that the damage to EL, principally between Binghamton and Salamanca, New York, amounted to $2 million ($ today), EL filed for bankruptcy on June 26, 1972. During the reorganization of the eastern railroads, it was thought that EL might be able to reorganize on its own, and there was a proposal by Chessie System to buy a portion of the EL. However, the operating unions could not reach a compromise, and Chessie canceled the agreement. Also, by 1975, the economy in the eastern United States was affected by the 1973 oil crisis, hurting any hopes of EL being able to independently compete with government-rehabilitated Conrail lines. Not surprisingly, EL asked to be included in Conrail. Due to the low density of traffic, the Honesdale Branch would not be included. Wayne County then made plans to purchase the line from EL to avoid abandonment.

Lackawaxen & Stourbridge
Proposals for short line operation were solicited from the Delaware Otsego Corporation, Rail Service Associates (operators of the Bath & Hammondsport Railroad) and TransAction Associates. Rail Service Associates (RSA) formed the Delaware, Lackawaxen & Western Railroad to take over the branch, and began its feasibility study. Early negotiations for subsidy came with the requirement that former union employees be made an offer for work at their current salary and benefit levels. Discussions with Conrail over rate divisions did not end favorably. In March, 1976, with less than a month to go before the start up of Conrail, RSA pulled out of its proposal.

An inquiry was made with Delaware Otsego (DO) to see if it was still interested in operating the line. Building off its recent success with the launch of the Central New York Railroad and the revival of the Fonda, Johnstown and Gloversville Railroad (FJ&G), DO was confident the Honesdale Branch would be profitable. With two weeks until the deadline, DO formed the Lackawaxen & Stourbridge Railroad (LASB). A spare locomotive from the FJ&G was shipped down to Lackawaxen in anticipation of the start-up. The ownership of the tracks was still in question, so an emergency order was handed down by the ICC directing LASB to operate the branch after March 30, 1976.

The first LASB train departed from Lackawaxen on April 1, 1976. The railroad's first blow was the loss of the local Agway mill in Honesdale. The railroad was purchased from the estate of EL by the Lackawaxen-Honesdale Shippers Association (LHSA) in 1977, with operation contracted to DO. In 1979, the Wayne County Chamber of Commerce launched seasonal passenger excursions.

After DO
In June, 1989, DO ended operations on LASB. The Stourbridge Railroad assumed operations through contract to Robey Railroads, operators of the North Shore Railroad. Seasonal passenger excursions continued to run, sponsored by Wayne County. Ownership of the line was conveyed from PennDOT to L&S on January 31, 2003.

Service was suspended in 2005, when a bridge spanning the Wallenpaupack Creek was destroyed after Pennsylvania Power & Light made emergency water releases from the Lake Wallenpaupack Dam following heavy rains in April, 2005; heavy rainfalls in June, 2006 further damaged the weakened structure. L&S acquired control of the Stourbridge from Robey in July, 2006.

A grant of $800,000 from the Pennsylvania Department of Community and Economic Development, plus $703,278 worth of FEMA money, were put towards repairing the trestle over Wallenpaupack Creek. In May, 2008, the line was purchased by Paul Brancato, a principal in Ideal Steel Supply Corp.,  who planned to build a steel fabrication plant at White Mills.

Operation were initially contracted to Central Penn Railroad. The line between Norfolk Southern Railroad and Route 590 in Lackawaxen, Pennsylvania was repaired in anticipation of resumed service. It was suddenly announced, in September, 2008, that operation would transfer from Central Penn Railroad to the Morristown & Erie Railway (M&E); operations began in January, 2009 as the Stourbridge Railway.

Passenger excursions to Hawley and Lackawaxen were operated on behalf of Wayne County.

Suspension and reopening
Citing a lack of funds, M&E withdrew service indefinitely in December, 2011. A news story dated September 11, 2012 provided additional details, stating "a lack of money is keeping the Stourbridge Line Railroad excursions in Wayne County idle for the first time in more than 30 years... [T]he train needs repairs, and so do the tracks. One reason those repairs are not being made is because the land the tracks run through is up for sale... With the tracks used by the Stourbridge line being up for sale, and all the repairs that need to be made, no one is sure when, or even if, this train will be back up and running."

The Stourbridge Line resumed operations on May 9, 2015. Operations were inaugurated by the Delaware Lackawaxen & Stourbridge Railroad under the auspices of Myles Group.

See also

 List of Pennsylvania railroads

Notes

Citations

Bibliography

External links
 The Stourbridge line – Scenic Train Rides of the Northern Poconos
 Lackawaxen-Honesdale Shippers Association "Rail Service Availability on the Stourbridge Railroad"
 Wayne County Chamber of Commerce Stourbridge Rail Line Excursions
 North East Rails – Unofficial North Shore, North East Pennsylvania Shortline Website

Pennsylvania railroads
Heritage railroads in Pennsylvania
Transportation in Wayne County, Pennsylvania
Transportation in Pike County, Pennsylvania